Aland is a City & Talaku in Kalaburagi district in the state of Karnataka, India. It is the headquarters of Aland Taluk. Aland was formed in 1952 as a town municipal council. It is 683 km from the state capital Bengaluru, 43 km from district headquarters Kalaburagi. It shares border with Maharashtra state and also 85.3 km away from Solapur.

Geography
It has an average elevation of 480 metres (1574 feet). The town is spread over an area of 8 km².

Aland Taluk has Kalaburagi Taluk of Kalaburagi district to the east, Afzalpur Taluk of Kalaburagi district to the south and Basavakalyan Taluk of Bidar district to the north-west.

Aland is a dry area, with low rainfall. Most of the population lives in poverty. A major chunk of the population in recent years has migrated to cities due to lack of water, low education facilities and poor employment opportunities. Power shortage is also a serious issue. Aland records high farmer suicides. Lack of natural resources and education has given birth to low industrialization and high unemployment. Aland is one of the top unproductive tehsils of India, be it in terms of revenue, employment, malnutrition, industrial development or agricultural development.

Demographics 
 India census, Aland had a population of 42,371. Males constitute 51.6% of the population and females 38%. Aland has a low literacy rate of 49.4%, lower than the national average of 59.5%; with 55% of males and 40% of females literate.

Kannada is the main language spoken. Marathi and Urdu are also spoken.

References 

Cities and towns in Kalaburagi district